Konstantin Mayevsky (born 5 October 1979), is a former Russian futsal player who played for the Russian national futsal team. Since 2022 he acts as head coach for Russian national futsal team.

References

External links
UEFA profile
AMFR profile

1979 births
Living people
Russian men's futsal players